The Rural Municipality of Winslow No. 319 is a rural municipality (RM) in the Canadian province of Saskatchewan within Census Division No. 13 and  Division No. 6.

History 
The RM of Winslow No. 319 incorporated as a rural municipality on December 13, 1909.

Geography

Communities and localities 
The following urban municipalities are surrounded by the RM.

Villages
 Dodsland
 Plenty

The following unincorporated communities are within the RM.

Localities
 Ava
 Druid (dissolved as a village, December 31, 1953)
 Millerdale
 Wallisville
 Whitepool

Demographics 

Government 
The RM of Winslow No. 319 is governed by an elected municipal council and an appointed administrator that meets on the second Wednesday of every month. The reeve of the RM is Sheldon McLean while its administrator is Regan MacDonald. The RM's office is located in Dodsland.

Transportation 
Highway 31—serves Dodsland, Saskatchewan and Plenty, Saskatchewan
Highway 658—serves Dodsland, Saskatchewan

See also 
List of rural municipalities in Saskatchewan
List of communities in Saskatchewan

References 

Winslow

Division No. 13, Saskatchewan